Messenger of Peace is a 1947 American drama film directed by Frank Strayer, which stars John Beal, Peggy Stewart, and Paul Guilfoyle. The screenplay was written by Glenn Tryon from an original story by Henry Rische. It was produced by the Lutheran Laymen's League, a men's association affiliated with the Lutheran Church–Missouri Synod as part of their centennial celebration.

Cast list
 John Beal as Rev. Armin Ritter
 Peggy Stewart as Evangeline Lockley
 Paul Guilfoyle as Peter Kerl
 Fred Essler as Hans Dacher
 Adeline De Walt Reynolds as Grandma Frommel
 Raphael Bennett as Gus Frommel
 Maudie Prickett as Matty Frommel
 Al Bridges as Harry Franzmeier
Elizabeth Kerr as Lottie Franzmeier
 William Gould as Jacob Torgel
 Edythe Elliott as Hilda Torgel
Brooke Shane as Magda Torgel
 Joe Brown Jr. as Ted Horner
 William Bakewell as Pastor Willie Von Adel Jr.

References

External links
 
 
 

1947 drama films
1947 films
American drama films
American black-and-white films
Films directed by Frank R. Strayer
Films about Christianity
Lutheran Church–Missouri Synod
1940s American films